Tomasz Kaczmarek (born 20 September 1984) is a Polish football manager

Coaching career
Kaczmarek moved from Poland to Germany at the age of 9 and only played on amateur level as an active footballer. 

He started his coaching career in 2009 as a part of the coaching staff at Bonner SC. From January 2011, he took charge of the U19's at the club and later a half year for the first team, which he was in charge of until the end of 2011, where he was hired as assistant manager for the Egyptian national team under manager Bob Bradley. Bradley and his coaching staff, including Kaczmarek, left in November 2013. On 30 March 2014, Kaczmarek followed Bradley to Norwegian club Stabæk IF, still as his assistant.

On 8 January 2020, Kaczmarek was appointed assistant coach of head coach Kosta Runjaić at Pogoń Szczecin.

On 1 September 2021, he was announced as the manager of Lechia Gdańsk. In his first season in charge, he led Lechia to a 4th place finish in Ekstraklasa. Exactly a year after his appointment, he was relieved of his duties following a poor start to the campaign, with Lechia crashing out of the UEFA Europa Conference League second qualifying round and at the bottom of the league table, with just one point following six games.

References

External links

1984 births
Living people
Polish football managers
3. Liga managers
Ekstraklasa managers
FC Viktoria Köln managers
Stuttgarter Kickers managers
SC Fortuna Köln managers
Lechia Gdańsk managers
Sportspeople from Wrocław
Polish expatriate football managers
Polish expatriate sportspeople in Germany
Polish emigrants to Germany